SLR Consulting is a privately owned international environmental consultancy with offices in Europe, North America, Australasia, and Africa. In 2017, it reported revenues of £129.6 million. It delivers advice and support on a wide range of strategic and project-specific issues to a diverse and growing base of business, regulatory and government clients.

History

Founding
The firm was founded as SECOR Ltd in 1994 by Alan Sheppard, John Leeson and David Richards. After establishing the company in Oxford, United Kingdom, in 1994, David oversaw the growth of the business from a small UK operator into one of the fastest growing and most profitable environmental consultancies in the UK, with international operations across Africa, Australasia, Canada, Europe, and the US

In 2000, the senior management team completed a management buyout and the company's name was changed to SLR Consulting Limited. In 2004 they secured funding from Livingbridge, who invested £4.85 million as part of a £13 million investment including other partners, and took a significant minority stake in the company. In 2008, 3i invested £32.5 million in the firm, and replaced Livingbridge with a significant minority stake. In 2018, Charterhouse Capital Partners (CCP) acquired a majority shareholding in the business. CEO Neil Penhall said on the investment, "In selecting Charterhouse, we have a new financial partner who recognises SLR's unique positioning in the market and has extensive experience in the environmental and advisory services sector...Charterhouse is very keen to support our exciting ongoing acquisition plans...[and] we share the same values and a clear vision of what we can achieve together."

David Richards was, until his death on 6 November 2013 at the age of 55, Chief Executive Officer from 1994–2013. In line with the Group's succession plans, Neil Penhall, formerly Managing Director of SLR Consulting and an Executive Director of SLR Management, assumed the role of CEO.

Expansion
Over the years the firm has expanded its offices, with additions across England, Scotland, Wales, Ireland, Northern Ireland, Australia, New Zealand, Singapore, South Africa, Namibia, Canada, and the US. By 2016 there were over 70 global offices and around 1100 staff.

SLR made a number of acquisitions, beginning with the UK-based Waste Management Engineering Limited in 2005. Then followed the UK-based landscape architect company Insite Environments; the Canadian company SEACOR Environmental Inc. the UK-based company FMH Consulting Engineers; the Irish Dublin-based environmental consultancy CSA; the specialist mineral planning, landscape and land management firm Bowman Planton; the UK based Architecture and Planning Solutions Alaska-based Hoefler Consulting Group; Australia-based Heggies Pty Limited; UK-based company Andrew McCarthy Associates; South African based GreenEng and Metago. In Namibia it acquired Bittner Water Consult CC, a sustainable groundwater consulting firm, and A Speiser Environmental Consultants, a Namibian-based specialist consultancy with expertise in EIAs. In October 2013, Cooper Partnership - Chartered Landscape Architects was acquired in Bristol, UK; and in early 2014, the acquisition of HFP Acoustical was completed, adding offices in Calgary, Alberta and Houston, Texas. In July 2014 South African-based consultancy CCA Environmental Pty (Ltd) was also acquired. In November 2014 SLR acquired the UK-based oil and gas solutions provider Challenge Energy, and most recently in February 2015 SLR acquired E.Vironment LLC, a Houston-based environmental management, health and safety, process safety, and transaction advisory firm.

Alliances
The firm has formed international alliances: in 2007, it renewed an agreement with the Maltese firm, AIS Environmental Ltd; and signed an agreement with the German energy from waste specialists, Born and Ermel. Afterwards, they signed a collaborative agreement with Greek environmental company, EPEM, and Abu Dhabi-based EDESSA.

Operations
SLR provides global consultancy advice and support on strategic and site-specific issues to business, regulatory and governmental clients. It specialises in the Oil & Gas, Built Environment, Mining & Minerals, Infrastructure, Industry and Power sectors.

Key projects
Gas sampling and analysis for CONSOL Energy, West Virginia, USA.
Environmental monitoring for OMV New Zealand Ltd.
Sustainable landscape design for Sir Robert McAlpine.
Design coordinators for Hampden Fields (Aylesbury, UK), a mixed-use sustainable urban extension.
Developed a detailed mine closure plan for OCAL Complex.
Pre-feasibility study and feasibility design for a new gold mine with Prodigy Gold Inc. 
Investigated railway vibration dampeners for Western Australia Public Transport Authority. 
Noise modeling for Queensland Department of Transport and Main Roads.
Planned and managed borehole drilling for Coca-Cola in Namibia.
Environmental and social governance due diligence assessment appointed by private equity firm 8 Miles.
Virtual reality modeling for National Grid.
Project management and technical and contract management support for two food waste anaerobic digestion plants for Kelda Water Services.

References

External links
Official site

Companies based in Buckinghamshire
Consulting firms of the United Kingdom